Machina Electrica (Latin for electricity generator) was a constellation created by Johann Bode in 1800. He created it from faint stars between Fornax and Sculptor, to the south of Cetus. It represented an electrostatic generator. The constellation was somewhat popular during the 19th century and had appeared in a number of star charts, but was eventually rendered obsolete when the International Astronomical Union standardized constellation boundaries in 1930 and is now no longer in use.

External links
 Star Tales: Machina Electrica by Ian Ridpath
 Astronomy Facts: Machina Electrica, by Shane Horvatin

Former constellations